Land of the Minotaur (UK title: The Devil's Men) is a 1976 Greek horror film directed by Kostas Karagiannis and written by Arthur Rowe. The film is also known as Minotaur and The Devil's Men.

Land of the Minotaur is actually the name of the shorter [86 minutes] U.S. edit of the film. When seen as The Devil’s Men, it is the full 94 minute European cut.

Plot
Tourists visiting a Greek archeological site are being abducted by a strange cult, intent on providing their God - the Minotaur - with sacrifice. Irish priest Father Roche (Donald Pleasence) enlists the help of Laurie Gordon, an archaeological student, and Milo Kaye, a private detective, to find out what has happened to them.

Cast
 Donald Pleasence as Father Roche
 Peter Cushing as Baron Corofax
 Luan Peters as Laurie Gordon
 Kostas Karagiorgis (credited as Costas Skouras) as Milo Kaye
 Fernando Bislamis (credited as Dimitris Bislanis) as Sgt Vendris
 George Venlis as Max
 Vanna Reville as Beth
 Nikos Verlekis as Ian
 Robert Behling (credited as Bob Behling) as Tom Gifford
 Anna Matzourani as Mrs. Mikaelis
 Anestis Vlachos as Shopkeeper - Karapades
 Jane Lyle as Milo's Girlfriend
 Jessica Dublin (credited as Jessica) as Mrs. Zagros

Reception

Critical response for Land of the Minotaur has been predominantly negative. TV Guide gave the film one out of four stars, calling it "[a] distinctly silly effort". HorrorNews.net found the film enjoyable in spite of its contrived plot, commending its soundtrack and chemistry between its two leads.

Praising the "suffocating ambiance and dream-like atmosphere", as well as Brian Eno's electronic score, Chris Alexander argues that the film is underrated: "Make no mistake, it's a lowbrow exploitation film, but it's one that’s filtered through a very stylised art house sensibility. Don't be swayed by the negative mainstream reviews and general fanboy silence." Emanuel Levy rated the film three out of five.

References

External links 
 
 

1976 films
1976 horror films
British horror films
English-language Greek films
Greek horror films
Films about cults
Folk horror films
Religious horror films
Films set in Greece
Crown International Pictures films
Minotaur
1970s English-language films
1970s British films